The Tandem Mirror Experiment (TMX and TMX-U) was a magnetic mirror machine operated from 1979 to 1987 at the Lawrence Livermore National Laboratory. It was the first large-scale machine to test the "tandem mirror" concept in which two mirrors trapped a large volume of plasma between them in an effort to increase the efficiency of the reactor.

The original TMX was designed and built in a short period between its conception at a major physics meeting in Germany in October 1976, its design in January 1977, and its completion in October 1978. Over the next year, it validated the tandem mirror approach. Plans began to build a much larger machine based on the same principles, the Mirror Fusion Test Facility (MFTF). MFTF was initially just a scaled-up version of TMX, but when the design was studied it was seen that it would not reach its desired performance. Some system was needed that would boost the internal temperature of the fuel.

A solution was found in the form of "thermal barriers" which would trap high-energy electrons and allow the fuel to be increased in energy without increasing leakage. While construction on MFTF began, thermal barriers were added to TMX to become TMX-U in 1982. While TMX-U validated the thermal barrier concept in general, the barriers were not stable. It appeared that MFTF would suffer the same problems. MFTF was almost complete by this time, and funding was cancelled the day after its completion. TMX-U continued to operate until February 1987.

History

Early mirrors and instability
Magnetic mirror machines were among the first serious designs for fusion reactors, along with the stellarator and z-pinch. The machine was very simple, consisting largely of a solenoid in which the wires were not wound evenly but had areas at each end with more windings. When a current ran through the windings, the resulting field would pinch down at the ends, causing the electrons and ions to reflect back into the center and thereby stay confined. Richard F. Post at the Lawrence Livermore National Laboratory (LLNL) became a major proponent of the concept, and Livermore became a worldwide center for mirror research.

In a famous talk in 1954, Edward Teller expressed his belief that machines like the mirror had an inherent instability, today known as the interchange instability, which would make them incapable of trapping a plasma for anywhere near the required time scales. At the time, in the infancy of the program, none of the existing machines could confine a plasma long enough to see whether this was true. By 1960, Livermore had built several ever-larger mirror machines with longer confinement times, and no hint of the problem could be found.

The mystery was solved at an international meeting in 1961 when Lev Artsimovich asked if the Livermore teams had calibrated a particular measurement instrument to account for a delay in its readings. They had not; it was immediately realized the apparent stability being measured was illusory. The US team concluded "we now do not have a single experimental fact indicating long and stable confinement."

Baseballs and yin-yang
In contrast to the Livermore teams, their Soviet counterparts at the Ioffe Institute were seeing signs of the interchange instability for some time. There was already a significant amount of research on how to avoid this problem, and at the same 1961 meeting, Mikhail Ioffe presented data from one such design, the "minimum-B", which showed clear signals that it was suppressing the instability. This design added additional current-carrying wires that modified the magnetic field to bend the plasma into a bow-tie shape. The six conductors were known as "Ioffe bars".

A new version of the basic concept emerged from the UK, the "tennis ball", which was quickly picked up at Livermore, Americanized to "baseball coils", and built in a series of machines known as ALICE, Baseball I and II. These machines had a single magnet which made them much easier to build, and also had the advantage of having a very large internal volume which made it easy to insert diagnostics. The downside to this design was that the magnet was very large relative to the volume of plasma it contained. Livermore's Ken Fowler took this basic design and modified it to produce the "yin-yang" variation, whose magnets were much closer to the plasma. This was built in the 2X series of machines.

As the new baseball machines demonstrated gross stability, it appeared that a working fusion reactor could be built using the design.

Tandem mirrors
These results were emerging in the early 1970s, which coincided with the 1970s energy crisis, and a resulting massive infusion of capital by the US federal government into new forms of energy. The fusion directorate, now under the direction of Robert L. Hirsch, began to redirect the labs away from pure research towards an effort to make a working reactor design. In this respect, while the mirrors were working well, they would have very poor real-world performance, the so-called Q. Even in the absolute best case it appeared they would be limited to a Q around 1.2, whereas a practical machine would need it to be at least 10. Hirsch's assistant, Stephen O. Dean, told Livermore's teams that they would have to increase the Q or be defunded.

In 1976 a potential solution was offered in the form of the "tandem mirror". In this concept, yin-yang coils would be placed at either end of a large tank of fusion fuel between them. The idea was that the fuel would be heated to fusion temperatures by neutral beam injection in the center of the mirrors, and then flow into the tank where it could continue to react. The very large volume of the tank combined with the relatively low-power magnets in that area multiplied the energy being released without requiring much more input.

The problem was that mirrors are naturally symmetrical, if the fuel could flow out one end into the tank it could just as easily flow out the other and escape entirely. To solve this problem, the tandem mirror aimed to create an "ambipolar" plasma. Ideally, this allowed it to contain electrons and ions differently. Because the ions are so much more massive than the electrons they can exist with different speeds simultaneously, whereas the electrons are almost always at high speed. By trapping a volume of ions in the mirrors, electrons would be attracted to the two sides of the reactor, forming an area of negative charge. Higher-energy ions escaping the center of the mirrors would preferentially be attracted towards these negative areas, into the center of the reactor.

TMX
Although funding had already been set aside for MFTF, with the great advance represented by the tandem approach it appeared a great improvement in performance was possible. Setting the goal of producing Q=5, a new MFTF concept was presented. This machine was so large that it would take years to build, the Livermore proposed building a much smaller machine to test the tandem layout. This was approved in January 1977 and became TMX.

TMX was completed in 1979 and initial experiments suggested the tandem layout was working as expected. Based on these results, the design of MFTF began. Every attempt to scale up TMX resulted in a machine that simply did not reach the desired performance goals. A further round of "Q enhancement" started and introduced yet another trapping mechanism, "thermal barriers", which required yet another set of mirrors and changes to the injectors.

TMX-U
MFTF would work one way or the other, with or without the barriers, so the decision was made to move ahead with the design while adding barriers to TMX to test the concept. This produced TMX-U. The machine was shut down in 1982.

Design 

The TMX was formally proposed by Fred Coensgen and the Livermore team on January 12, 1977 to the US Energy Research and Development Administration.  The project was projected to cost 11 million dollars.  The design consisted of five rings of current around the plasma.  The ends uses shaped "Baseball" magnets at the end to stop plasma from escaping.  This design produced magnetic forces that increase in every direction away from the center of the mirror region. A fusion plasma shaped like a twisted bow tie is confined inside a magnetic mirror.  Designing appropriate plugs was a challenge for all magnetic mirror machines.  The baseball design was later replaced by the exotic yin-yang magnets of the MFTF.  Problems with escaping plasma led researchers towards the Tokamak where plugs were eliminated by looping the field together.

TMX-U 
A summary of results from the original runs with TMX was published in February 1981.  At this time, the facility underwent a major overhaul. A thermal barrier was added to better contain the plasma, the number of rings was increased to over ten the vacuum and diagnostic system was overhauled and extra magnets were added to plug up losses.  The new machine was referred to as the "TMX-U" and it operated into the late eighties.

Criticism 
Lawrence Lidsky famously criticized the magnetic mirror machines by saying: "They kept adding one set of magnets a year until it collapsed under its own weight" and in his article "The Trouble With Fusion."

Further reading 
 "Tandem Mirror experiment with thermal barriers" G A Carlson, UCRL-52836, September 19, 1979.
 "Thermonuclear confinement systems with twin mirror systems" by G I Dimov, Soviet journal of plasma physics, volume 2 number 4
 "Ion Losses from End-Stopped Mirror Trap" DP Chernin, MN Rosenbluth, Institute for Advanced Study, Nuclear Fusion 1978
 "Improved Tandem Mirror Fusion Reactor" By D E Baldwin, Physical Review Letters, October 29, 1979.

References

Magnetic mirrors
Lawrence Livermore National Laboratory